Tumor protein p53-inducible protein 11 is a protein that in humans is encoded by the TP53I11 gene.

References

Further reading